Llanallgo is a small village a mile from the coast of the island of Anglesey. The community is in the  community of Moelfre, Ynys Môn, Wales, which is 136.4 miles (219.6 km) from Cardiff and 214.9 miles (345.9 km) from London.

St Gallgo's Church, contains a memorial to hundreds lost when the Royal Charter bound from Australia to Liverpool hit the nearby Moelfre rocks. 140 are buried in the churchyard and others nearby. The monument is said to be of marble cut from near where the ship was lost on 26 October 1859.

Nearby is Ffynnon Allgo, a medieval well which is a scheduled monument. There is a caravan park. The nearest larger village is Marian-glas, about 1 km to the south.

References

Villages in Anglesey
Moelfre, Anglesey